Daku Raj Punjabi film is a 1992 Pakistani action film. Directed by Idrees Khan, written and produced by Nasir Adeeb. The film starring Sultan Rahi, Javed Sheikh, Neeli, Afshan Qureshi, Ghulam Mohiuddin.

Track list

Film's music soundtrack was composed by the musician Wajahat Attre, with song lyrics by Waris Ludhianvi and sung by Noor Jehan.

References

External links
 

1990s crime action films
Pakistani crime action films
1992 films
Punjabi-language Pakistani films
1990s Punjabi-language films